Ephraim Tanner Sturtevant (July 28, 1803 – December 12, 1881) was an American professor, planter, and politician.  He was the father of Julia Tuttle, known as the "Mother of Miami".

Sturtevant, son of Warren and Lucy (Tanner) Sturtevant, was born in Warren, Connecticut, July 28, 1803.  In 1816, his family removed to the Western Reserve, and settled in Tallmadge, Ohio, from which place he entered college. He graduated from Yale College in 1826.

For twenty years after graduation he was occupied in teaching, beginning in Derby, Connecticut. In the fall of 1827, on the opening of Western Reserve College, at Hudson, Ohio, he was appointed instructor in mathematics, and in the absence of other teachers performed the duties of the entire faculty for the first year. In May, 1829, finding the burden too severe, he resigned his position, and opened a select school in Tallmadge, which he maintained with great success until 1846, when, in consequence of impaired health, he removed to a farm in East Cleveland, O., where he interested himself in all matters of public improvement and education.

At length he felt obliged to remove from this trying climate, and in March, 1870, he settled on Biscayne Bay in Southern Florida, where he occupied himself in cultivating tropical fruits and flowers. He also took an active part in the Reconstruction government of the State, and was efficient in promoting the control of the Republican party. He was twice appointed County Judge, and in 1872 was elected to the Florida State Senate for four years.

In the spring of 1880 the infirmities of advancing age compelled him to return to Cleveland, where he made his home with his only surviving daughter, during the rest of his life. He died in Cleveland, December 12, 1881, aged 78 years.

In 1829 he married Helen L. Oviatt, of Hudson, who died early, leaving a daughter who survived for only a single year. He next married Julia A. DeForest, of Huntington, Conn., who died in 1845, leaving a daughter and two sons. He was again married to Frances (Pierce) Leonard, of Woodbury, Conn., who survived him with one daughter; one son by the second marriage also survived him.

On his death, his daughter Julia Tuttle inherited and relocated to his land in Florida, where she would eventually found the city of Miami.

External links

1803 births
1881 deaths
People from Warren, Connecticut
Yale College alumni
Case Western Reserve University faculty
19th-century American politicians
People from Tallmadge, Ohio
People from East Cleveland, Ohio
Florida state senators